Maggie's Club is a Margaret Thatcher themed nightclub in Chelsea, London. The venue has overt references to the former Prime Minister, such as black-and-white photos on the stairs, a mural of Thatcher on the wall, and the former Conservative leader's speeches playing in the lavatories.

References

Nightclubs in London